ROCS Cheng Ho (鄭和, PFG2-1103) is the second of eight Taiwanese-built Cheng Kung-class frigates of the Republic of China Navy, based on the Oliver Hazard Perry class.

Construction and career 
Laid down on 21 December 1991 and launched on 15 October 1992, Cheng Ho (鄭和) was commissioned into service on 28 March 1994. All of the Taiwanese PFGs have the length of the later Oliver Hazard Perry FFGs, but have a different weapon and electronics fit.

Gallery

See also
ROCS Chi Kuang (PFG2-1105)
ROCS Tzu I (PFG2-1107)
ROCS Pan Chao (PFG2-1108)
ROCS Chang Chien (PFG2-1109)
ROCS Tian Dan (PFG2-1110)

References

Cheng Kung-class frigates
Ships built in the Republic of China
1992 ships
Frigates of the Republic of China